The women's marathon at the 2014 European Athletics Championships took place in Zürich on 16 August.

Medalists

Records

Schedule

Results

CR - Championship Record; PB - Personal Best; SB - Season Best; DNF - Did Not Finish.

Marathon Cup
The Women's Marathon doubled as the 2014 European Marathon Cup. Each country may enter up to six athletes and the results are determined by aggregating the times of the team's three best runners.

References

External links
Results

Marathon W
Marathons at the European Athletics Championships
European Athletics Championships
Women's marathons
2014 in women's athletics
Marathons in Switzerland